Ejembi Eko (born 23 May 1952 Benue State, Nigeria) is a Nigerian jurist and former Justice of the Supreme Court of Nigeria.

References 

1952 births
People from Benue State
Supreme Court of Nigeria justices
Nigerian jurists
Living people